NSH may refer to:

 Nashville Predators, a National Hockey League team; based in Nashville, Tennessee, United States 
 Nashua Corporation (former NYSE symbol NSH)
 Nashville Kats, an Arena Football League team
 National Show Horse, a breed of horses
 North Sheen railway station (station code NSH), in the London Borough of Richmond
 North Shore railway station (station code NSH), in Victoria, Australia
 Noshahr Airport, Iran (IATA airport code NSH)
 Nova Scotia Highlanders, a Canadian reserve regiment
 Royal North Shore Hospital, Sydney, Australia
 .nsh is the file extension for the Nullsoft Scriptable Install System